

The Luscombe 10 was a single-seat sport aircraft built in the United States in 1945. It was a conventional, low-wing cantilever monoplane with fixed, tailwheel landing gear, designed for aerobatics. The wings, tail unit, and engine section were all adapted from the Luscombe 8, while the fuselage center section was an all-new design, relocating the Model 8's wings from a high to low position.

Despite promising results from flight testing, Luscombe ultimately felt that there was not a sufficient market for the type, and development was halted almost immediately. The sole prototype (registration NX-33337) was destroyed in 1948 for tax reasons.

Specifications

References

Notes

Bibliography
 
 
 
 

1940s United States sport aircraft
10
Low-wing aircraft
Single-engined tractor aircraft
Aircraft first flown in 1945